Capital. A Critique of Political Economy. Volume II: The Process of Circulation of Capital is the second of three volumes of Capital: Critique of Political Economy. It was prepared by Friedrich Engels from notes left by Karl Marx and published in 1885.

Contents 
Volume II is divided into three parts:
 The Metamorphoses of Capital and Their Circuits
 The Turnover of Capital
 The Reproduction and Circulation of the Aggregate Social Capital

In this book, the main ideas behind the marketplace are to be found, namely how value and surplus-value are realized. Its dramatis personae, not so much the worker and the industrialist (as in Volume I), but rather the money owner and money lender, the wholesale merchant, the trader and the entrepreneur or functioning capitalist. Moreover, workers appear in Volume II essentially as buyers of consumer goods and therefore as sellers of the commodity labour power, rather than producers of value and surplus-value, although this latter quality established in Volume I remains the solid foundation on which the whole of the unfolding analysis is based.

Marx wrote in a letter sent to Engels on 30 April 1868: "In Book 1 [...] we content ourselves with the assumption that if in the self-expansion process £100 becomes £110, the latter will find already in existence in the market the elements into which it will change once more. But now we investigate the conditions under which these elements are found at hand, namely the social intertwining of the different capitals, of the component parts of capital and of revenue (= s)". This intertwining, conceived as a movement of commodities and of money, enabled Marx to work out at least the essential elements, if not the definitive form of a coherent theory of the trade cycle, based upon the inevitability of periodic disequilibrium between supply and demand under the capitalist mode of production (Ernest Mandel, Intro to Volume II of Capital, 1978). Part 3 is the point of departure for the topic of capital accumulation which was given its Marxist treatment later in detail by Rosa Luxemburg, among others.

See also 
 The Accumulation of Capital
 Das Kapital
 Capital, Volume I
 Capital, Volume III
 Marxian economics

References

Further reading 
 Bottomore, Tom, ed. (1998). A Dictionary of Marxist Thought. Oxford: Blackwell.
 Fine, Ben (2010). Marx's Capital. 5th ed. London: Pluto.
 Harvey, David (2010). A Companion to Marx's Capital. London: Verso.
 Harvey, David (2006). The Limits of Capital. London: Verso.
 Heinrich, Michael (2012). An Introduction to the Three Volumes of Marx's Capital. New York: Monthly Review Press.
 Mandel, Ernest (1970). Marxist Economic Theory. New York: Monthly Review Press.
 Postone, Moishe (1993). Time, Labor, and Social Domination: A Reinterpretation of Marx's Critical Theory. Cambridge: Cambridge University Press.
 Shipside, Steve (2009). Karl Marx's Das Kapital: A Modern-day Interpretation of a True Classic. Oxford: Infinite Ideas. 
 Wheen, Francis (2006). Marx's Das Kapital--A Biography. New York: Atlantic Monthly Press. . .

External links 

 Marx, Karl; Engels, Friedrich, ed. (1885). "Capital Volume II". Full text at Marxists Internet Archive.
 Capital Volume II, complete book in PDF format by Progress Publishers
 Harvey, David (January 2012). "Reading Marx's Capital". Harvey's video lectures on Volume II chapter by chapter.

1885 non-fiction books
Books by Karl Marx
Unfinished books
1885 in economics
Books published posthumously